Ilia Mikhailovich Frolov (born April 4, 1984 in Samara) is a modern pentathlete from Russia. He is also a multiple-time medalist in the World and European Championships, and World Cup circuits, and is currently ranked no. 3 in the world by the Union Internationale de Pentathlon Moderne (UIPM).

Frolov qualified for the 2008 Summer Olympics in Beijing, along with his teammate and defending champion Andrey Moiseev, and competed in the men's event. During the competition, Frolov struggled in the early segments, with slightly fair scores in pistol shooting and a one-touch épée fencing, but he was managed to perform consistently in the final rounds, including his second-place finish for the 3 km cross-country running. Frolov's best result in the last round was insufficiently enough to reach the top position, and he eventually finished in twentieth place, while Moiseev successfully defending his Olympic title.

Despite his disappointing performance at the Olympics, Frolov eventually won a team gold medal at the 2011 World Modern Pentathlon Championships in Moscow, and added another winning streak at the UIPM World Cup circuits in Chengdu, China, and in Charlotte, North Carolina in the United States.

References

External links
 

Russian male modern pentathletes
1984 births
Living people
Olympic modern pentathletes of Russia
Modern pentathletes at the 2008 Summer Olympics
Sportspeople from Samara, Russia
World Modern Pentathlon Championships medalists